SMS Csepel was one of six s built for the  (Austro-Hungarian Navy) shortly before the First World War. Completed in 1913, she helped to sink an Italian destroyer during the action off Vieste in May 1915 after Italy declared war on Austria-Hungary. Two months later the ship participated in an unsuccessful attempt to recapture a small island in the central Adriatic Sea from the Italians. In November and early December Csepel was one of the ships conducting raids off the Albanian coast to interdict the supply lines between Italy and Albania. She was hit one time during the First Battle of Durazzo in late December. Her stern was blown off by a French submarine in early 1916 and her repairs were not completed until early 1917.

Csepel participated in several unsuccessful raids on the Otranto Barrage in 1917, although she sank an Italian destroyer during the Battle of the Strait of Otranto. During the action of 22 April 1918 in the Strait of Otranto, the ship helped to damage a pair of British destroyers. She was transferred to Italy in 1920 in accordance with the peace treaties ending the war and renamed Muggia. The  (Royal Italian Navy) transferred her to the Far East in 1927 where she ran aground and was wrecked during a typhoon two years later.

Design and description
The Tátra-class destroyers were faster, more powerfully armed and more than twice as large as the preceding . The ships had a complement of 105 officers and enlisted men.

The Tátras were powered by two AEG-Curtiss steam turbine sets, each driving a single propeller shaft using steam provided by six Yarrow boilers. Four of the boilers were oil-fired while the remaining pair used coal.

The main armament of the Tátra-class destroyers consisted of two 50-caliber Škoda Works  K10 guns, one each fore and aft of the superstructure in single, unprotected mounts. Their secondary armament consisted of six 45-caliber  guns, two of which were on anti-aircraft mountings. They were also equipped with four  torpedo tubes in two twin rotating mountings amidships.

Construction and career
Csepel was laid down by Ganz-Danubius at their shipyard in Porto Ré in the Kingdom of Croatia-Slavonia of the Austro-Hungarian Empire on 9 January 1912, launched on 30 December 1912 and completed on 29 December 1913. The Tátra-class ships did not play a significant role in the minor raids and skirmishing in the Adriatic in 1914 and early 1915 between the Entente Cordiale and the Central Powers. On 13 August 1914, Csepel rescued 76 survivors and pulled 18 bodies from the water from the Austro-Hungarian passenger ship  after it had blundered into a minefield and sunk. The destroyer had her propeller shaft bearings replaced from 9 to 12 May 1915.

Action off Vieste

The Kingdom of Italy signed a secret treaty in London in late April 1915 breaking its alliance with the German Empire and Austro-Hungary and promising to declare war on the Central Powers within a month. Austro-Hungarian intelligence discovered this and Admiral Anton Haus, commander of the Austro-Hungarian Navy, planned a massive surprise attack on Italian ports and facilities on the northern Adriatic coast, outside of interception range of the modern ships of the  stationed at Taranto. To warn of any Italian warships able to interfere with the bombardments, Haus prepositioned three groups of destroyers, each led by a scout cruiser. Placed in the central Adriatic between the island of Pelagosa and the Italian coast, four days prior to the Italian declaration of war on 23 May, were four Tátra-class destroyers, including Csepel, and the cruiser . Around midnight on the night of 23/24 May, Haus ordered the reconnaissance groups to move west and attack Italian coastal targets.

The Italian ships separated when Aquilone went to investigate a sighting; Helgoland began bombarding the city of Barletta at 04:00 and the Italian destroyer spotted the cruiser at 04:38. Aquilone turned away to the southeast and was able to disengage without any damage. Turbine, however, encountered Helgoland several minutes later and believed that she was an Italian ship until she was disabused by a salvo from the cruiser. The destroyer turned to the north, towards Vieste, to escape, with Helgoland and the destroyer  in pursuit. , which had been bombarding Vieste, was ordered to block her escape to the north while Helgoland stayed to the east to cut off her access to the Adriatic. Lika scored the critical hit of the battle when one of her 66-millimeter shells broke Turbines steam pipe and caused her to rapidly lose speed. Tátra and Helgoland also scored hits and Turbine was dead in the water with a list when her crew abandoned ship at 06:51. She had hit Tátra and Csepel during the engagement, but failed to inflict any significant damage. The Austro-Hungarians rescued 35 survivors before torpedoing the derelict ship. As they were withdrawing they were engaged by the protected cruiser  and the armed merchant cruiser  between 07:10 and 07:19. Helgoland was struck by one shell before they were able to disengage from the slower ships.

On 23 July Helgoland and her sister , escorted by Csepel, Tátra, their sister  and three other destroyers bombarded the towns of Termoli, Ortona and San Benedetto del Tronto while a landing party cut the telegraph cable in Tremiti. Five days later, all six Tátra-class ships and the same pair of cruisers, reinforced by the German submarine , attempted to recapture Pelagosa. Despite a heavy bombardment by the ships, the 108-man landing party was unable to overcome the 90-man garrison and was forced to withdraw.

The Bulgarian declaration of war on Serbia on 14 October cut the existing supply line from Serbia to Salonika, Greece, and forced the Allies to begin supplying Serbia through ports in Albania. This took about a month to work out the details and the Austro-Hungarians took just about as long to decide on a response. Haus ordered Seitz to take Helgoland, Saida and all six Tátra-class destroyers on a reconnaissance mission off the Albanian coast on the night of 22/23 November. They encountered and sank a small cargo ship and a motor schooner carrying flour for Serbia; four Italian destroyers were unable to intercept them before they reached friendly territory. On 6 December, Helgoland and the Tátras swept down the coast to Durazzo, sinking five motor schooners, including two in Durazzo harbor.

First Battle of Durazzo

If they were not found he was to arrive at Durazzo at dawn and destroy any ships found there. He was unable to find the destroyers and dutifully arrived off Durazzo at dawn. At 07:30 he ordered four of his destroyers into the harbor to sink the cargo ship and two schooners anchored there while Helgoland engaged the coastal artillery defending the port. A well-camouflaged  artillery battery opened fire at 08:00 at point-blank range. While maneuvering to avoid its fire, Lika and Triglav entered a minefield. After striking two mines in quick succession, Lika sank at 08:03 and Triglav was crippled when her boiler rooms flooded after hitting one mine. Tátra was finally successful in securing a tow at 09:30, but was limited to a speed of  when Seitz led his ships northwards. He radioed for assistance at 10:35 and was informed an hour later that the armored cruiser  and four torpedo boats were en route to support him.

Italian observers had spotted Seitz's ships at 07:00 and the Allied quick-reaction force of the British light cruiser , commanded by Captain Percy Addison, and the Italian scout cruiser , escorted by five French destroyers, sortied in an attempt to cut off the Austro-Hungarian ships from their base at Cattaro. These were followed two hours later by the Italian scout cruiser , the British light cruiser  and four Italian destroyers. Seitz ordered Triglav to be abandoned at 13:15 once the smoke from these ships had been spotted and for Csepel to turn to the south then southwest while the main body briefly covered her before turning southwest themselves. The French destroyers were ordered to deal with Triglav at 13:38 while the cruisers pursued Seitz's ships.

Quartos captain initially positioned his ship in trail behind Dartmouth, thinking to cut-off Csepel, but Addison ordered Quarto to fall in on Dartmouths port quarter around 14:15, away from Csepel. She only fired 23 times by 15:08 and managed to hit Csepel once, inflicting little damage. The destroyer managed to rejoin Seitz's main body about 16:45 and the Austro-Hungarians were able to disengage before reaching the Italian coast when darkness fell around 17:30.

On 27 January 1916, Novara, Csepel and Orjen departed Cattaro on a mission to attack the shipping in Durazzo harbor. En route the two sisters accidentally collided with each other and had to return to port although the cruiser continued the mission. Csepel was under repair until 21 April. On 4 May, the  torpedoed the destroyer off Cattaro and blew off her stern. She was towed to port for emergency repairs and was then towed to Fiume for permanent repairs on 13–16 May. On 3 June, Csepel was moved to Porto Ré where she was fitted with a replacement stern taken from one of the  under construction. After working up, the ship returned to Cattaro on 31 October. On the night of 11/12 March 1917, Balaton, Orjen, Csepel and Tátra swept through the Strait of Otranto, but failed to sink the French cargo ship  that they encountered.

Battle of the Strait of Otranto

On the night of 14/15 May, Balaton and Csepel departed Cattaro with orders to search off the Albanian coast and the Strait of Otranto for Allied shipping. They were intended to act as a diversion for the attack by the three  scout cruisers on the Otranto Barrage. Csepel lit up Borea with her searchlight at 03:24 and opened fire immediately afterward, hitting the Italian ship four times in rapid succession. One of the hits broke her main steam pipe which caused her to slow to a stop and the others set her on fire; she sank shortly before dawn.

Italian observers reported this action at 03:48 and the patrolling Italian scout cruiser  and her escorting trio of French destroyers were alerted at 04:35 and turned south to intercept. They did not spot the Austro-Hungarian ships, but another group of Allied ships did at 07:45. This group consisted of two British light cruisers, the brand-new Italian scout cruiser  and four Italian destroyers under the command of Rear Admiral Alfredo Acton. He ordered Aquila and the destroyers to investigate five minutes later as the Austro-Hungarian ships turned away towards Durazzo. The scout cruiser was the fastest ship in the Italian fleet and she opened fire at 08:15 at a range of  while closing the range to  before Csepel hit her once at 08:32; severing her main steam line, killing seven men and causing her to lose power. The destroyers continued the pursuit, but broke off when shells from Durazzo's coastal artillery began dropping around them about 09:05. After the Italian ships moved to rejoin Acton's force at 09:18, Balaton and Csepel turned towards Cattaro, evading an attack by Bernoulli en route. During the battle, Csepel fired 127 rounds from her main guns, 78 shells from her secondary armament and two torpedoes.

Helgoland and all of the Tátras attempted to duplicate the success of the earlier raid on 18–19 October, but they were spotted by Italian aircraft and turned back in the face of substantial Allied reinforcements alerted by the aircraft. On the night of 13 December, Csepel, Tátra and Balaton raided the Otranto Barrage, but disengaged after firing torpedoes at what they believed to be four Allied destroyers, although there is no record of any attacks that night in Allied records.

The smaller ships in the Austro-Hungarian Navy were the most active ones and their crews had the highest morale; most of the larger ships did little but swing on their moorings which did nothing to improve the morale of their crews. On 1 February, the Cattaro Mutiny broke out, starting aboard the armored cruiser . The mutineers rapidly gained control of Kaiser Karl VI and most of the other major warships in the harbor. Unhappy with the failure of the smaller ships' crews to join the mutiny, the mutineers threatened to fire at any ship that failed to hoist a red flag. Csepels crew hoisted a flag with the permission of her captain with the proviso that there should be no disturbances aboard ship. The following day, many of the mutinous ships abandoned the effort after coast-defense guns loyal to the government opened fire on the rebel guard ship . The scout cruisers and Csepel, among other ships, took advantage of the confusion to rejoin loyalist forces in the inner harbor where they were protected by coastal artillery. The next morning, the s arrived from Pola and put down the uprising. The destroyer was refitted in Pola from 7 to 20 April.

Action of 22 April 1918

On the night of 22–23 April 1918, Csepel and all four s attempted to intercept Allied shipping in the Strait of Otranto. The British ships altered course to intercept them. At a range of about  the leading Austrian destroyer opened fire. The British ships reversed course and began laying a smoke screen hoping to lure the Austrians further south. The Austrians began hitting their targets quickly with Jackal slightly damaged by three hits, but Hornet was badly damaged by hits that caused a fire and subsequent explosion in her forward magazine and jammed her steering so that she began turning circles. Their return fire was ineffective, but the Austrians disengaged after about 15 minutes, pursued by Jackal. Csepel received an extensive refit from 13 June to 7 October in Pola. She returned to Cattaro the following day, but was back in Pola by the war's end.

End of the war
By October it had become clear that Austria-Hungary was facing defeat in the war. With various attempts to quell nationalist sentiments failing, Emperor Karl I decided to sever Austria-Hungary's alliance with Germany and appeal to the Allies in an attempt to preserve the empire from complete collapse. On 26 October Austria-Hungary informed Germany that their alliance was over. At the same time, the Austro-Hungarian Navy was in the process of tearing itself apart along ethnic and nationalist lines. Vice Admiral Miklós Horthy was informed on the morning of 28 October that an armistice was imminent, and used this news to maintain order and prevent a mutiny among the fleet. While a mutiny was spared, tensions remained high and morale was at an all-time low.

The following day the National Council in Zagreb announced Croatia's dynastic ties to Hungary had come to an end. This new provisional government, while throwing off Hungarian rule, had not yet declared independence from Austria-Hungary. Thus Emperor Karl I's government in Vienna asked the newly formed State of Slovenes, Croats and Serbs for help maintaining the fleet stationed at Pola and keeping order among the navy. The National Council refused to assist unless the Austro-Hungarian Navy was first placed under its command. Emperor Karl I, still attempting to save the Empire from collapse, agreed to the transfer, provided that the other "nations" which made up Austria-Hungary would be able to claim their fair share of the value of the fleet at a later time. All sailors not of Slovene, Croatian, Bosnian, or Serbian background were placed on leave for the time being, while the officers were given the choice of joining the new navy or retiring.

The Austro-Hungarian government thus decided to hand over the bulk of its fleet, preferring to do that rather than give the fleet to the Allies, as the new state had declared its neutrality. Furthermore, the newly formed state had also not yet publicly repudiated Emperor Karl I, keeping the possibility of reforming the Empire into a triple monarchy alive.

Post-war
On 3 November the Austro-Hungarian government signed the Armistice of Villa Giusti with Italy, ending the fighting along the Italian Front, although it refused to recognize the transfer of Austria-Hungary's warships. As a result, on 4 November, Italian ships sailed into the ports of Trieste, Pola, and Fiume and Italian troops occupied the naval installations at Pola the following day. The National Council did not order any men to resist the Italians, but they also condemned Italy's actions as illegitimate. On 9 November, all remaining ships in Pola harbour had the Italian flag raised. At a conference at Corfu, the Allies agreed the transfer could not be accepted, despite sympathy from the United Kingdom. Faced with the prospect of being given an ultimatum to surrender the former Austro-Hungarian warships, the National Council agreed to hand over the ships beginning on 10 November. When the Allies divided up the Austro-Hungarian Fleet amongst themselves in January 1920, Csepel was awarded to Italy. She was commissioned in the Regia Marina with the name Muggia on 26 September and transferred to Shanghai, China, in March 1927. The ship ran aground and was wrecked on the Finger Rocks near Hea Chu Island near Amoy, in dense fog and darkness, or during a typhoon, on 25 March 1929. The 77 survivors were rescued from rocks by the Japanese oiler  after the fog lifted on 26 March.

Notes

Citations

Bibliography 
 

 
 
 

Tátra-class destroyers
1912 ships